The 2014 Philippine National Games was held in Metro Manila, Philippines from May 16–25, 2014. The opening ceremony was held at the Ninoy Aquino Stadium in Manila on May 15, 2014.

Sports

References

2014 in Philippine sport
Philippine National Games
Sports in Metro Manila
May 2014 sports events in the Philippines